Georgiana Uhlyarik-Nicolae, also known as Georgiana Uhlyarik (born 1972) is a Romanian-born Canadian art curator, art historian, and teacher. She is currently the Fredrik S. Eaton Curator of Canadian Art at the Art Gallery of Ontario (AGO). She has been part of the team or led teams that created numerous exhibitions, on subjects such as Betty Goodwin, Michael Snow, and Kathleen Munn among others and collaborated with art organizations like Tate Modern, and the Jewish Museum, New York.

Biography 
Uhlyarik was born in Bucharest, Romania as the only child of Mariana Nicolae, an architect and Nicolae Uhlyarik, a chemical engineer.

Uhlyarik is the Fredrik S. Eaton Curator of Canadian Art at the Art Gallery of Ontario (AGO) since 2002. In 2014, the AGO hosted another Uhlyarik project, Introducing Suzy Lake. The 2015 exhibition Picturing the Americas that opened at the AGO and then toured the United States and Brasil, which Uhlyarik co-curated with P.J. Brownlee, curator of the Terra Foundation for American Art and Valeria Piccoli chief curator at the Pinacoteca do Estado de São Paulo, Brazil won the 2016 Award of Excellence of the Association of Art Museum Curators (AAMC). Uhlyarik worked on the 2017 AGO Georgia O'Keeffe retrospective which was both an artistic achievement and a commercial success. In 2018 she co-curated TUNIRRUSIANGIT, an AGO exhibition of works by Kenojuak Ashevak and Tim Pitsiulak. She also co-curated and contributed to the catalogue of Magnetic North: Imagining Canada in Painting 1910-1940 (2021), co-organized by the Schirn Kunsthalle Frankfurt, the Art Gallery of Ontario, and the National Gallery of Canada.

Uhlyarik teaches courses on Canadian art at the University of Toronto where she is an Associate Professor, is an outspoken advocate for the promotion of women artists and curators as well as publicizing of Canadian indigenous art.

Uhlyarik is the author of Kathleen Munn: Life & Work (2014), published by the Art Canada Institute.

References 

Canadian women curators
1972 births
Living people
Romanian emigrants to Canada
Canadian art curators
Women art historians